The 1944 Sheffield Attercliffe by-election was held on 21 February 1944.  The byelection was held due to the resignation  of the incumbent Labour MP, Cecil Wilson.  It was won by the unopposed Labour candidate John Hynd.

References

1944 in England
1944 elections in the United Kingdom
By-elections to the Parliament of the United Kingdom in Sheffield constituencies
Unopposed by-elections to the Parliament of the United Kingdom (need citation)
1940s in Sheffield